This is a list of cities, towns, villages and missions in Zambia.

Cities

Towns, villages and missions

Chadiza
Chama
Chandesi
Chavuma
Chembe
Chibombo
Chiengi
Chilubi
Chililabombwe
Chinsali
Chinyingi
Chirundu
Chisamba
Choma
Gwembe
Isoka
Kabompo
Kafue
Kafulwe
Kalabo
Kalene Hill
Kalomo
Kalulushi
Kanyembo
Kaoma
Kapiri Mposhi
Kasempa
Kashikishi
Kataba
Katete
Kawambwa
Kazembe (Mwansabombwe)
Kazungula
Kibombomene
Luangwa
Lufwanyama
Lukulu
Lundazi
Macha Mission
Makeni
Mansa
Mazabuka
Mbala
Mbereshi
Mfuwe
Milenge
Misisi
Mkushi
Mongu
Monze
Mpika
Mporokoso
Mpulungu
Mumbwa
Muyombe
Mwinilunga
Nchelenge
Ngoma
Nkana
Nseluka
Pemba
Petauke
Samfya
Senanga
Serenje
Sesheke
Shiwa Ngandu
Siavonga
Sikalongo
Sinazongwe
Solwezi
Venture
Zambezi
Zimba

See also
Districts of Zambia
Provinces of Zambia
List of cities by country
List of Zambia-related topics
 List of cities in East Africa

References

Zambia
Cities and towns
 
Zambia